John McClean may refer to:

 John McClean (bishop) (1914–1978), Bishop of Middlesbrough, 1967–78
 John Robinson McClean (1813–1873), British civil engineer and Liberal Party politician

See also 
 John McLean (disambiguation)
 John MacLean (disambiguation)
 Jack McLean (disambiguation)
 John McLane (1852–1911), furniture maker and politician from Milford, New Hampshire
 John McClane, fictional protagonist of the Die Hard film series portrayed by Bruce Willis